Botnsvatnet or Botsvatnet is a lake in the municipality of Valle in Agder county, Norway. The  lake is located just north of the lakes Rosskreppfjorden and Kolsvatnet and the mountain Urddalsknuten, and it lies to the southeast of the mountain Bergeheii.

See also
List of lakes in Aust-Agder
List of lakes in Norway

References

Lakes of Agder
Valle, Norway